Canadian federal elections have provided the following results in Central Quebec.

Regional profile
This area was one of the power bases for the Bloc Québécois for two decades. In fact, before 2011, the BQ won at least seven of its nine seats in each of the preceding four elections, losing Saint-Maurice (Jean Chrétien's old riding) in 1993, 1997 and 2000 and Portneuf in 2000, which both went Liberal.  They swept all nine ridings in 2004, and in 2006 and 2008 lost only Lotbinière—Chutes-de-la-Chaudière to the Conservatives and Portneuf-Jacques-Cartier to independent candidate André Arthur.

Before the rise of Mulroney in 1984, this area was traditionally Liberal, except for Joliette (the only riding in Quebec that voted anything other than Liberal in 1980), and Lotbinière (which voted Social Credit in 1979). Mulroney's Conservatives swept the area in 1988, and 1984 (except for Chrétien's seat).

The 2011 NDP surge saw New Democrats sweeping all but two seats in the region, with the Conservatives and Bloc Québécois holding one each.  In 2015, Bloc Québécois rebounded to take three more ridings, while the Liberals regained Saint-Maurice—Champlain. Bloc Québécois continued to regain its place in 2019, taking out the NDP.

Votes by party throughout time

2019 – 43nd General Election

2015 – 42nd General Election

2011 – 41st General Election

2008 – 40th General Election

2006 – 39th General Election

2004 – 38th General Election

Maps 

Berthier-Maskinongé
Joliette
Lotbinière-Chutes-de-la-Chaudière
Montcalm
Portneuf
Repentigny
Richelieu
Saint-Maurice-Champlain
Trois-Rivières

2000 – 37th General Election

1997 – 36th General Election

1993 – 35th General Election

1988 – 34th General Election

Notes

Canadian federal election results in Quebec